Frederick William Gantt (November 27, 1922 – January 11, 2002) was an American professional basketball player. He played for the Sheboygan Red Skins in the National Basketball League during the 1947–48 season and averaged 1.8 points per game.

References

1922 births
2002 deaths
American men's basketball players
Basketball players from Richmond, Virginia
Guards (basketball)
Forwards (basketball)
Richmond Spiders men's basketball players
Sheboygan Red Skins players